Tawfiq Ziad (also spelt Tawfik Zayyad or Tawfeeq Ziad, 7 May 1929 – 5 July 1994) was a Palestinian Israeli politician well known for his "poetry of protest".

Biography
Born in Nazareth, Palestine during the Mandatory Palestine, Ziad was active in communist circles since his youth. His nom de guerre was Abu el-Amin (‘The Trustworthy One’). Ignoring Israeli closure measures, he played an important inspirational role in rallying villagers in the Galilee against a number of measures, and urging a tax revolt. He was arrested at Arrabeh on 24 April 1954, and confined to Nazareth for half a year and therefore subject to restrictions on his freedom of movement.   Under Israeli military rule (1948-1966) he was arrested and imprisoned several times. Between 1962 and 1964 he was educated at the Higher Party School in Moscow.
 
After returning home, he was elected mayor of Nazareth on 9 December 1975, as the leader of the Democratic Front of Nazareth, a victory that is said to have "surprised and alarmed" Israelis. He would serve as mayor for 19 years, until his 1994 death in office.

Elected to the Knesset in the 1973 elections on Rakah's list, Ziad was active in pressuring the Israeli government to change its policies towards Arabs - both those inside Israel and in the occupied Palestinian territories. A report he co-authored on Israeli prison conditions and the use of torture on Palestinian inmates was reprinted in the Israeli newspaper Al HaMishmar. It was also submitted to the United Nations by Tawfik Toubi and Ziad after their visit to Al-Far'ah prison on 29 October 1987. It was subsequently quoted from at length in a UN General Assembly report dated 23 December 1987, where it was described as "Perhaps the best evidence of the truth of the reports describing the repugnant inhumane conditions endured by Arab prisoners."

Poetry
The theme of sumud, which became a major literary theme as a form of resistance, played an important role in Ziad's poetry. He is particularly well known for his poem Here We Will Stay:

In Lydda, in Ramla, in the Galilee,
 we shall remain
like a wall upon your chest, and in your throat
like a shard of glass
a cactus thorn,
and in your eyes
a sandstorm,

We shall remain 
a wall upon your chest,
clean in your restaurants,
serve drinks in your bars,
sweep the floors of your kitchens
to snatch a bite for our children
from your blue fangs.

Death
Ziad died on 5 July 1994 in a head-on collision in the Jordan Valley on his way back to Nazareth from Jericho after welcoming Yasser Arafat, the chairman of the Palestine Liberation Organization, back from exile. He was survived by his wife and four children.  At the time of his sudden death, he was still Mayor of Nazareth, a member of the Knesset and "a leading Arab legislator". A street is named after him in Shefa-'Amr.

Footnotes

References

External links
Tawfiq Ziad home page 

Ziad's poetry 
Tawfiq Ziad; Israel and 'Unadikum' . By Tim King. Salem News, 15 May 2011.

1929 births
1994 deaths
Politicians from Nazareth
Israeli poets
Palestinian poets
Arab members of the Knesset
Mayors of Nazareth
Maki (political party) politicians
Hadash politicians
20th-century poets
Road incident deaths in Israel
Members of the 8th Knesset (1974–1977)
Members of the 9th Knesset (1977–1981)
Members of the 10th Knesset (1981–1984)
Members of the 11th Knesset (1984–1988)
Members of the 12th Knesset (1988–1992)
Members of the 13th Knesset (1992–1996)